Brewham is a civil parish in Somerset, England, consisting of the villages of North Brewham and South Brewham, on either side of the river in the Brue Valley  east of Bruton and  south-west of Frome in the South Somerset district.  The parish has a population of 441.

History

The name of the villages comes from the settlement on the River Brue. In 1066 it was held by Robert son of Wimarc the Staller but after the Norman Conquest was given to William de Moyon is mentioned as a manor belonging to William de Moyon who gave it to his son, William de Mohun of Dunster. Later the manor was given to Bruton Abbey until the Dissolution of the Monasteries when it was granted to Sir Maurice Berkeley.

In 1251 Robert de Musgrove was granted a licence by the king to enlarge Brewham Park, which had previously been held by William de Montacute.

Brewham was part of the hundred of Bruton.

Governance

The parish council has responsibility for local issues, including setting an annual precept (local rate) to cover the council's operating costs and producing annual accounts for public scrutiny. The parish council evaluates local planning applications and works with the local police, district council officers, and neighbourhood watch groups on matters of crime, security, and traffic. The parish council's role also includes initiating projects for the maintenance and repair of parish facilities, as well as consulting with the district council on the maintenance, repair, and improvement of highways, drainage, footpaths, public transport, and street cleaning. Conservation matters (including trees and listed buildings) and environmental issues are also the responsibility of the council.

The village falls within the Non-metropolitan district of South Somerset, which was formed on 1 April 1974 under the Local Government Act 1972, having previously been part of Wincanton Rural District. The district council is responsible for local planning and building control, local roads, council housing, environmental health, markets and fairs, refuse collection and recycling, cemeteries and crematoria, leisure services, parks, and tourism.

Somerset County Council is responsible for running the largest and most expensive local services such as education, social services, libraries, main roads, public transport, policing and fire services, trading standards, waste disposal and strategic planning.

The village is part of 'Tower' electoral ward. This ward stretches to Shepton Montague and Cucklington avoiding Wincanton. The total population of the ward at the 2011 census was 2,442.

It is also part of Somerton and Frome county constituency represented in the House of Commons of the Parliament of the United Kingdom. It elects one Member of Parliament (MP) by the first past the post system of election, and was part of the South West England constituency of the European Parliament prior to Britain leaving the European Union in January 2020, which elected seven MEPs using the d'Hondt method of party-list proportional representation.

Geography

North Brewham Meadows is a biological Site of Special Scientific Interest because of the traditionally-managed species-rich meadows which support a neutral grassland community of the nationally rare common knapweed crested dog's-tail type. Breeding butterflies typical of unimproved neutral grassland include small copper (Lycaena phaeas), meadow brown (Maniola jurtina), grayling (Hipparchia semele) and ringlet (Aphantopus hyperantus).

Landmarks

Religious sites

The Church of Saint John the Baptist in South Brewham has 13th-century origins, however the current building is largely from the late 19th century.

References

External links

Civil parishes in Somerset
South Somerset